Sierra City (Sierra, Spanish for "mountain range") is a census-designated place in Sierra County, California, United States. The population was 221 at the 2010 census.

History

Before the California Gold Rush, only Native Americans had ventured into the area, which lies northwest of Lake Tahoe on the western slope of the Sierra Nevada, and which lay between areas inhabited by Maidu, Nisenan, and Washo peoples (Pre-Contact Tribal Map). The area is now part of the Tahoe National Forest.

A settlement was established in 1850 by Philo A. Haven and Joseph Zumwalt, who were also involved with the settling of Downieville (Sinnott). In the Winter of 1852-53, however, an avalanche of snow destroyed the settlement, which was not rebuilt for several years. Ferdinand, Gustav, and Christian Reis purchased several mining claims near the Sierra Buttes and began to resettle Sierra City, which had a peak population of 3,000 during the decade after gold was discovered in California (1849).

Numerous hard-rock gold mines were developed on both sides of the North Yuba River Canyon near Sierra City. These include the Colombo Mine, the Independence Mine, the Keystone Mine, the Monumental Mine, the Great Sierra Buttes Mine, and the William Tell Mine. The Monumental Nugget, weighing over 106 pounds avoirdupois, was recovered in September 1869.

Placer mining was also practiced and continues today on the banks of the North Yuba. On February 10, 1963, Alec M. Ostrom of Sierra City discovered a nugget weighing 8 troy ounces while placer mining (Sinnott.)

Historic buildings

Historic buildings that remain in Sierra City include the two-story brick Busch Building, which the Wells Fargo Company occupied in the 19th century, and the Masonic Lodge, both of which sit on the town's main street, which is Highway 49. The town hall, a log structure, was built after World War II, and a new post office, dedicated in 1969, features stone work in which antique mining implements, including an ore-car, are embedded. The Bigelow House, a Victorian structure, is situated near the town's southwestern limits. The cemetery contains gravestones dating back to the 1860s.

Cultural attractions

The town-limit signs list Sierra City's population as 225. The main industry is tourism. None of the nearby hard-rock mines are in operation, but the Kentucky mine just outside the town limits now houses a mining museum. In the summer months, fishing in the North Yuba and its tributaries and in nearby alpine lakes is popular, as is mountain-biking, placer-mining, and hiking. A cluster of sheer rock peaks, known as the Sierra Buttes, is 1.6 miles (2.6 km) from Sierra City and towers over the town. Many trails cross the area, and the Pacific Crest Trail crosses the flanks of the Sierra Buttes some 2,000 feet (610 m) above the town. Wild Plum Campground is a little more than a mile away on Haypress Creek.

The nearest public school is 12 miles (19 km) away in Downieville.

Geography
According to the United States Census Bureau, the CDP covers an area of 2.2 square miles (5.6 km), 99.99% of it land and 0.01% of it water.

Sierra City has a mediterranean continental climate (Koppen: Dsb). Summers are hot and dry, while winters are mild, wet and very snowy, with annual snowfall averaging 107 inches (272 cm).

Demographics
The 2010 United States Census reported that Sierra City had a population of 221. The racial makeup of Sierra City was 200 (90.5%) White, 0 (0.0%) African American, 2 (0.9%) Native American, 3 (1.4%) Asian, 0 (0.0%) Pacific Islander, 12 (5.4%) from other races, and 4 (1.8%) from two or more races. Hispanic or Latino of any race were 21 persons (9.5%).

The Census reported that 221 people (100% of the population) lived in households, 0 (0%) lived in non-institutionalized group quarters, and 0 (0%) were institutionalized.

There were 113 households, out of which 14 (12.4%) had children under the age of 18 living in them, 54 (47.8%) were opposite-sex married couples living together, 8 (7.1%) had a female householder with no husband present, 7 (6.2%) had a male householder with no wife present. There were 12 (10.6%) unmarried opposite-sex partnerships, and 0 (0%) same-sex married couples or partnerships. 34 households (30.1%) were made up of individuals, and 15 (13.3%) had someone living alone who was 65 years of age or older. The average household size was 1.96. There were 69 families (61.1% of all households); the average family size was 2.35.

The population was spread out, with 16 people (7.2%) under the age of 18, 14 people (6.3%) aged 18 to 24, 30 people (13.6%) aged 25 to 44, 104 people (47.1%) aged 45 to 64, and 57 people (25.8%) who were 65 years of age or older. The median age was 56.6 years. For every 100 females, there were 102.8 males. For every 100 females age 18 and over, there were 101.0 males.

The homeowner vacancy rate was 1.1%; the rental vacancy rate was 21.2%. 170 people (76.9% of the population) lived in owner-occupied housing units and 51 people (23.1%) lived in rental housing units.

Politics

References

Sources
 California-Indian Pre-Contact Tribal Areas Map, 
 Kelly, Leslie A. Traveling California's Gold Rush Country. Falcon, 1997.
 Sinnott, James J. History of Sierra City and History of Goodyear's Bar [one volume], 1978.
 Sinnott, James J. History of Sierra County, 1977.

External links

 Kentucky Mine Historic Park and Museum
 Sierra City website
 Malakoff.com: Sierra City
 Mountainzone.com

Census-designated places in Sierra County, California
Populated places in the Sierra Nevada (United States)
Census-designated places in California